This is a timeline of speech and voice recognition, a technology which enables the recognition and translation of spoken language into text.

Overview

Full timeline

See also  
 Speech recognition
 List of speech recognition software

References

Speech recognition
Speech and voice recognition